Requiem Canticles is a ballet made for New York City Ballet's Stravinsky Festival by balletmaster Jerome Robbins to eponymous music from 1966 by Igor Stravinsky. The premiere took place June 25, 1972, at the New York State Theater, Lincoln Center.

Original cast 
Merrill Ashley
Susan Hendl
Robert Maiorano
Bruce Wells

Reviews 
NY Times, Clive Barnes, June 26, 1972

New York City Ballet repertory
Ballets to the music of Igor Stravinsky
1966 ballet premieres
Ballets by Jerome Robbins
New York City Ballet Stravinsky Festival